Biriukove (Biryukovo) is an urban-type settlement in Dovzhansk Raion of Luhansk Oblast, a part of Ukraine. The Ukrainian government recognizes the settlement as Krynychne. Population: , .

It is situated in 18 km from Sverdlovsk near the river Kundrjutsja, feeder of Seversky Donets. The nearest railway station, Dolzhanskaya, is situated in 12 km out of Biryukove. The villages of Bratskoe and Dovzhanske are under subordination of Biryukove, because it is a center of Village Council.

History
Biryukove was found in 1778 by serfs from villages Rovenky and Krasnovka, as village Krinichnoe.

In December 1917 Soviet government take a control under village.

In 1920 it was renamed in Biryukove, in honor of the Communist, chairman of the Council of Peasant Deputies Biryukov V.M., who was killed in March by local opponents of Soviet government.

About a thousand of citizens were participants of World War II, about 340 died, more than 700 were decorated.

In 1964 it got a status of urban-type settlement.

Since 2014, Biryukove has been administerd as a part of the de facto Luhansk People's Republic. On July 7, 2014, one Ukrainian border guard was wounded after a mortar attack on this town's checkpoint, south of Sverdlovsk, Luhansk Oblast.

Gallery

References

External links
Unofficial site

Urban-type settlements in Dovzhansk Raion
Sverdlovsk Raion
Yekaterinoslav Governorate